Syed Fasihuddin Soharwardy (born 15 June 1957) is a leading nasheed Khawan or Naat Khawan from Pakistan. Most of his work is in the Urdu 
language. However, he has performed nasheeds (Naats) in multiple languages including Punjabi, Persian and Arabic.

Early life and career
He was born on 15 June 1957 in Karachi, Pakistan. He has been performing nasheeds starting from a young age, and
was heavily influenced by his father, Syed Riazuddin Soharwardy, who was a poet of Naats. For his regular high school education, he did his high school from Government Secondary School and his Bachelor of Arts degree from the Government  
Islamia Science College, Karachi. He 
currently resides in Karachi, Pakistan but frequently travels to Europe and North America to perform in 
different shows and events.

His naat style is considered to be unique 
with a very powerful voice.

References

1957 births
Living people
Muhajir people
People from Karachi
Pakistani performers of Islamic music
Islamic poetry
Islamic music